Léon Gurekian (26 April 1871 in Constantinople2 September 1950 in Asolo) was an Ottoman Armenian architect, writer and political activist. He was active in the Ottoman Empire, Bulgaria and Italy.

Biography

Léon Gurekian, the son of Hovhannes Gurekian and Prapion Yeremian, was born in Constantinople on 26 April 1871. His Armenian family originated and resided in Trebizond and worked in business relations between the Middle East and Europe - especially Marseille.

He studied first in Trebizond before and completed studies at the Mechitarist Armenian College of Venice in 1888. He then went to Rome where he graduated in 1895 both from the "Regio Istituto di Belle Arti di Roma" with the Diploma of Professor of architectural design and from the "Regia Scuola di Applicazione degli Ingegneri" with a degree in architecture.

He married Mariamik Azarian in 1901, in Constantinople. Their only son Ohannés Gurekian was born in 1902 and was also architect.

Career

Bulgaria

Shortly after returning to Constantinople in 1896, he managed to escape the pogroms of the Armenians by the Sultan Abdul Hamid II by taking refuge in Bulgaria. After getting his architecture degree recognized by the Bulgarian Government, he designed various buildings and won the contest to design the Municipal Professional Theatre in Varna which was later built with only slight modifications by Bulgarian architect Nikola Lazarov.

Constantinople

Returning to Constantinople in 1899, Gurekian designed numerous buildings in the town and on the islands of Prinkipo (Islands of Prince, Büyükada). During his period he had contacts with the architects of the Balyan family, which family archive includes many original drawings and photos.
During this period Gurekian was also intensely politically active, publishing under a pseudonym in Armenian newspapers.

Italy
On 7 September 1907, he moved suddenly and without apparent explanation to Rome.

In 1908 he obtained from the Regio Istituto di Belle Arti di Roma in Rome, the Diploma of Professor of Architectural Design, on the basis of his studies there in architecture in 1895.

In 1911 he designed and built the Ottoman Pavilion to the International Exhibition in Turin. This is one of the only works he designed in Italy, the others being the funeral chapel of a friend of his in Trieste and his home - Villa Ararat - in Asolo, Treviso.

In September 1911 he was appointed representative of the Ottoman Government to the International Congress of architects in Rome, but while there the Italo-Turkish War arose and he participated as a regular member of the Association of Architects which was already part.

Starting in 1911, and increasingly in subsequent years, he spent time in Asolo which is also the summer residence of the Armenian College in Venice. For several years from 1921 onwards he went in vacation in Frassené in the province of Belluno where the environment reminded him of Toz at Trebizond, where his family had a summer residence during his childhood.

In 1912 he began a long project to survey important monuments of Byzantine and Romanesque Architecture in Ravenna, Aquileia, Istria, Dalmatia and especially in Brianza with the aim of studying the influence of Armenian Architecture on Romanesque Architecture. This was basically in opposition to the thesis of G.T. Rivoira.

From 19141918 the First World War forced him to stay in Asolo where he made a living as a photographer.

In 1919 he went to Paris where he published a political analysis of World War I in the form of an animal allegory: "The Responsible". While there he also participated in political efforts towards the constitution of the Independent Republic of Armenia.

In 1922, becoming bitterly aware of the impossibility of returning to what would be the Independent Armenian Republic given the failure of the Treaty of Versailles (1919), he decided to settle in Asolo and designed and built his home there.

From that moment, he totally abandoned architecture. He published a series of political and philological studies, mostly in the Armenian language. In "Kars and Ardahan" he put forward the Armenian claim to those provinces, which were ceded to Turkey in the Treaty of Alexandropol.

At the end of the Second World War a Delegation of the Soviet Armenian Republic went to Asolo to ask Gurekian if he was willing to move to Armenia. Being already sick he refused, but stated in support of that cause that: behind me there was always a photograph of General Antranik (Andranik Ozanian).

He died in Asolo on 2 September 1950 and was buried in family grave.

Architectural Contributions

Bulgaria 1896-1898

 1897 
 Casino - Kasorlik 
 Agricultural Cash and Savings - Sofia and other cities
 Villa - Sofia 
 Villa of the ing. Nicolof - Sofia 
 1898 
 Theater in Varna - competition (first prize)

Ottoman Empire1898-1907
 1898 
 Armenian Church - Trazbon 
 Accommodation of Sisters - Samsoun 
 Church Our Lady of Lourdes of Georgian Fathers - Constantinople 
 1899 
 Dwelling Mndighian - Constantinople 
 Home of Ghiridli Moustafa Pacha - Sultan Ammed - Constantinople 
 Palace of the Grand Vizir Halil Riphath, Pacha - Nichan Tachy - Constantinople 
 Villa Hilmi view Bey - Bebek - Constantinople 
 1900 
 Apartments Munif Pacha - Constantinople 
 Apartments Ibraïm Bey Effendi - Constantinople 
 Pavilion for Rachid Pacha - Balta Limar - Constantinople 
 Palace (S)aleddin Pacha - Constantinople 
 Palace Hairiz - Constantinople 
 Palace and pavilions Hassan Pacha - Constantinople 
 Palace Kemaleddine Pacha - Constantinople 
 Palace and Guard House Moustafa Bey on the Bosphorus - Hissar - Constantinople 
 Villa Candilli - Constantinople 
 Villa Moustafa Bey - Prinkipo 
 Villa Sami Pacha - Constantinople
 1903 
 Villa Agopian - Prinkipo 
 Apartments Joseph Azarian - Ayaz Pacha (today Gümüssuyu Palas) - Constantinople 
 1904 
 Apartments Rosenthal - Constantinople 
 Houses in S. Hagop (10 houses) - Constantinople 
 Accommodation gardens Azarian - Pendik 
 1905 
 Apartments Gurekian (two buildings) - Pangalti Rue Pariaz - Constantinople 
 Dwelling Chahbaz Maksoud - Chichli - Constantinople 
 1906 
 Apartments E. Schahnazar - Constantinople 
 Apartments Léon Gurekian - Constantinople - Ayaz Pacha 
 Apartments Coumbaradji - Constantinople 
 Funerary chapel Yeranouhi Keutcheyan - Constantinople 
 Undated 
 Dwelling Karamanian - Constantinople 
 Dwelling Vedat Bey - Constantinople 
 Dwelling Vefik Bey - Constantinople 
 Apartments Yechil - Constantinople 
 Apartments Karamanian - Constantinople 
 Apartments Macsoud Bey - Asman Bey - Constantinople 
 Apartments Manouelian - Chichli - Constantinoplev
 Apartments Perouz Agha - Constantinople

Italy 1908-1950
 1911 
 Pavilion of the Ottoman Empire at the International Exhibition - Torino 
 1913 
 Funerary chapel family Aïdinian - Trieste 
 1924 
 Villa Ararat - Asolo (Treviso)

Publications
 Léon Gurekian, Il Concilio Cattolico Armeno di Roma, Considerazioni di un Patriota Armeno, Conti e Gandolfi, Sanremo 1912 - (in Italian)
 Léon Gurekian, The centenary of a couple of poets , Centenary of the birth of Robert Browning and Elizabeth Barrett Browning (Քերթող Ամոլի մը Հարիւրամեակը, Ռոբերտ Բրաւնինգի Ծննդեան Հարիւրամեակը եւ Եղիսաբէթ Բառռէտ-Բրաւնինգ), Scant, Ghalatia 1912 - (in Armenian)
 Léon Gurekian, L'Armenia nell'anima italiana, C.Colombo, Roma 1919 - (in Italian)
 Léon Gurekian, Le Responsable - Allégorie historique dans le Règne Animal, Jouve & C.ie Éditeurs, Paris 1919 - (in French)
 Léon Gurekian, The two-thousandth of Virgil (Վիրգիլեան երկհազարամեակը), San Lazzaro, Venezia 1931 - (in Armenian)
 Léon Gurekian, Primo Centenario della Fondazione del Collegio Armeno Moorat-Raphaël, Venezia (1836/1936), G.Fabris, Venezia 1936 - (in Italian)
 Léon Gurekian, Kars e Ardahan - Historical Documentation and National Rights (Կարս եւ Արտահան - Պատմական Հաւաստիք եւ Հայրենաւանդ Իրաւունք), S.Lazzaro, Venezia 1949 - (in Armenian)

References

External links

 Gurekian Family
 Léon Gurekian architetto (Armen Gurekian, Asolo 2010)
 Asolo

Bibliography
 Unione degli Studenti Armeni d'Italia, Indipendenza Armena, celebrata in Asolo, 20 agosto 1920, Tipografia del Seminario, Padova 1921
 Armen Gurekian, Léon Gurekian architetto, Asolo 2010
 Agop Manoukian, Presenza Armena in Italia, 1915-2000, Guerrini e Associati, Milano 2014
 Prando Prandi, La mia Asolo, Duck Edizioni, Castelfranco Veneto 2014,

Exhibitions 
 National Museum-Institute of Architecture of Armenia - Yerevan (Armenia), Léon Gurekian architect, 15 Mars - 15 May 2015
 Vanadzor (Armenia), Léon Gurekian architect, 3 October - 20 December 2015

Ethnic Armenian architects
Armenians from the Ottoman Empire
Emigrants from the Ottoman Empire to Italy
1871 births
1950 deaths